The FIL European Luge Natural Track Championships 1999 took place in Szczyrk, Poland. This is the second this city has hosted these championships, doing so previously in 1985.

Men's singles

Women's singles

Men's doubles

The Ruetz-Brothers won their third straight championships at this event.

Medal table

References
Men's doubles natural track European champions
Men's singles natural track European champions
Women's singles natural track European champions

FIL European Luge Natural Track Championships
Luge
Sport in Silesian Voivodeship
1999 in luge
Luge in Poland
1999 in Polish sport